Gough Whitlam (1916–2014) was the 21st prime minister of Australia.

Whitlam may also refer to:

 Division of Whitlam, an electoral division in New South Wales
 Whitlam (surname), a list of people with the name
 Whitlam, Australian Capital Territory, a suburb of Canberra, Australian Capital Territory

See also
 Whitlam Institute, Western Sydney University
 The Whitlams, an Australian indie rock band formed in late 1992